Flabellinopsis is a genus of sea slugs, aeolid nudibranchs, marine gastropod mollusks in the family Flabellinopsidae.

Species
The following species are within the genus Flabellinopsis:
 Flabellinopsis iodinea (J. G. Cooper, 1863)

References 

Flabellinopsidae